Open water swimming at the 2015 World Aquatics Championships was held between 25 July and 1 August 2015 in Kazan, Russia.

Events
The following events were contested by both men and women in Kazan:

5 km
10 km
25 km

In addition, there was a team competition with male and female competitors.

Schedule
Seven events were held.

All time are local (UTC+3).

Medal summary

Medal table

Men

Women

Team

References

External links
Official website

 
Open water swimming
Open water swimming at the World Aquatics Championships
Open water swimming at the World Aquatics Championships